Matia Kasaija is a Ugandan politician. He is the current Minister of Finance in Uganda's Cabinet. He was appointed to that position on 1 March 2015, replacing Maria Kiwanuka, who was appointed to Senior Presidential Advisor for Finance. From 27 May 2011 until 28 February 2015, he served as the State Minister for Finance (Planning) in the Cabinet of Uganda. He replaced Ephraim Kamuntu, who was promoted to Minister of Tourism. Before that, he served as the State Minister for Internal Affairs, from 1 June 2006 until May 2011. He is also the elected Member of Parliament for  "Buyanja County", Kibaale District.

Background and education
He was born in Kibaale District on 28 May 1944. He studied at University of Nairobi, back in the 1960s when it was part of the University of East Africa. Kasaija graduated with the degree of Bachelor of Commerce (BCom) circa 1967.

Work experience
During the Ugandan elections of 1980, at the age of 36, Matia Kasaija was elected to the Ugandan Parliament. From 1980 until 1981, he served as the State Minister for Labor. From 1981 until 1986, he served as a member of the External Wing of the National Resistance Army. Between 1987 and 1990, he served as the executive director of the Departed Asians Property Custodian Board, a government parastatal that was charged with safeguarding the property expropriated from the Asians expelled from the country by Idi Amin in the 1970s. From 1998 until 1998 he served as the deputy director for Mass Mobilization at the National Resistance Movement Secretariat. During the 2006 parliamentary elections, he was elected to the 8th Parliament. He was appointed Minister of State for Internal Affairs in June 2006. In the national elections of 2011, he was re-elected to his parliamentary seat. In the cabinet reshuffle on 27 May 2011, he was reassigned to the Finance Ministry, as the State Minister for Planning.

Other activities
 African Development Bank (AfDB), Ex-Officio Member of the Board of Governors (since 2015)
 East African Development Bank (EADB), Ex-Officio Member of the Governing Council (since 2015)
 International Monetary Fund (IMF), Ex-Officio Member of the Board of Governors (since 2015)
 Islamic Development Bank, Ex-Officio Member of the Board of Governors (since 2015)
 Multilateral Investment Guarantee Agency (MIGA), World Bank Group, Ex-Officio Member of the Board of Governors (since 2015)
 World Bank, Ex-Officio Member of the Board of Governors (since 2015)
 Global Partnership for Effective Development Co-operation, Co-chair (-2019)

Personal details
Matia Kasaija is married. He is reported to enjoy travel, swimming, reading, and sports.

See also
 Parliament of Uganda
 Cabinet of Uganda
 Kibaale District

References

External links
Website of the Parliament of Uganda

Living people
1944 births
People from Kibaale District
University of Nairobi alumni
Members of the Parliament of Uganda
Finance Ministers of Uganda
National Resistance Movement politicians
People from Western Region, Uganda
21st-century Ugandan politicians